Havemeyer is a German surname. It may refer to the Havemeyer family. Notable persons with that name include:

 Electra Havemeyer Webb (1888–1960), American antiques collector
 Camilla Woodward Moss Havemeyer (1869–1934), American socialite
 Charles Frederick Havemeyer (1867–1898), American socialite
 Henry Osborne Havemeyer (1847–1907), American sugar manufacturer
 Loomis Havemeyer (1886-1971), American author and professor
 Louisine Havemeyer (1855–1929), American art collector, suffragist, philanthropist
 Theodore Havemeyer (1839–1897), American sugar manufacturer and golf administrator
 William Frederick Havemeyer (1804–1874), American businessman and politician

German-language surnames